Obrh Creek is a losing stream that originates and terminates in the Lož Karst Field in the Municipality of Loška Dolina. It is a watercourse in the Ljubljanica watershed. It is created by the confluence of Little Obrh Creek and Big Obrh Creek; the latter is fed by two tributaries: Brežiček Creek and Viševek Brežiček Creek. The confluence, at which point it is simply named Obrh, lies west of the village of Pudob. In the northwest, limestone part of the karst field, Obrh Creek starts to drain into many sinkholes, and higher water flows into  Golobina Cave. The stream re-emerges at the spring of the Stržen River  to the northwest on the southeast edge of the Cerknica Karst Field.

Name 
The name Obrh comes from the Slovene common noun obrh, referring to a powerful karst spring that usually surfaces below a cliff, creating a small deep lake that flows into a valley. The noun is originally a fused prepositional phrase, *ob vьrxъ 'at the summit' (i.e., at the highest point of the watercourse).

References

External links

Obrh Creek on Geopedija

Sinking rivers
Municipality of Loška Dolina
Rivers of Inner Carniola